State Trunk Highway 58 (often called Highway 58, STH-58 or WIS 58) is a state highway in the U.S. state of Wisconsin. It runs north–south in southwest Wisconsin from the Necedah to Richland Center.

Route description
WIS 58 starts at the junction with US 14 in between Richland Center and Sextonville. The highway then meanders north, passing through Aubrey, Ithaca, and Neptune. North of Neptune, it intersects WIS 154. Continuing north, it passes through Loyd, Cazenovia, Ironton, and La Valle. In La Valle, it runs concurrently with WIS 33. In Mauston, WIS 58 then runs concurrently with WIS 82, intersects US Highway 12/WIS 16 (US 12/WIS 16) and then leaves the concurrency. WIS 58 crosses over I-90/I-94 without an interchange; the Interstate can be reached via WIS 82  to the east. Just west of the Yellow River, the highway ends at WIS 80 south of Necedah.

History
Initially, WIS 58 ran from WIS 11 (now US 14) in Sextonville to WIS 33 in La Valle. In 1923, WIS 58 extended northward to WIS 12/WIS 29 (now US 12/WIS 16) in Mauston. That same year, its southern terminus moved slightly to the west, avoiding Sextonville. In 1994, another significant change was made. This time, it was extended northward to WIS 80 south of Necedah, superseding County Trunk Highway Q (CTH-Q).

Major intersections

See also

References

External links

058
Transportation in Richland County, Wisconsin
Transportation in Sauk County, Wisconsin
Transportation in Juneau County, Wisconsin